Winners of the 1989 Pulitzer Prize by Category

Journalism awards

Public Service:
Anchorage Daily News, for reporting about the high incidence of alcoholism and suicide among native Alaskans in a series that focused attention on their despair and resulted in various reforms.
General News Reporting:
 Staff of Louisville Courier-Journal, for its exemplary initial coverage of a bus crash that claimed 27 lives and its subsequent thorough and effective examination of the causes and implications of the tragedy.
Investigative Reporting:
 Bill Dedman of The Atlanta Journal-Constitution, for his investigation of the racial discrimination practiced by lending institutions in Atlanta, reporting which led to significant reforms in those policies.
Explanatory Journalism:
David Hanners, reporter, William Snyder, photographer, and Karen Blessen, artist of The Dallas Morning News, for their special report on a 1985 airplane crash, the follow-up investigation, and the implications for air safety.
Specialized Reporting:
Edward Humes of the Orange County Register, for his in-depth reporting on the military establishment in Southern California.
National Reporting:
Donald L. Barlett and James B. Steele of The Philadelphia Inquirer, for their 15-month investigation of rifle shot provisions in the Tax Reform Act of 1986, a series that aroused such widespread public indignation that Congress subsequently rejected proposals giving special tax breaks to many politically connected individuals and businesses.
International Reporting:
Bill Keller of The New York Times, for resourceful and detailed coverage of events in the U.S.S.R.
International Reporting:
Glenn Frankel of The Washington Post, for sensitive and balanced reporting from Israel and the Middle East.
Feature Writing:
David Zucchino of The Philadelphia Inquirer, for his richly compelling series, Being Black in South Africa.
Commentary:
Clarence Page of the Chicago Tribune, for his provocative columns on local and national affairs.
Criticism:
Michael Skube of the News & Observer, Raleigh, North Carolina, for his writing about books and other literary topics.
Editorial Writing:
Lois Wille of the Chicago Tribune, for her editorials on a variety of local issues.
Editorial Cartooning:
Jack Higgins of the Chicago Sun-Times.
Spot News Photography:
Ron Olshwanger, a free-lance photographer, for a picture published in the St. Louis Post-Dispatch of a firefighter giving mouth-to-mouth resuscitation to a child pulled from a burning building.
Feature Photography:
Manny Crisostomo of the Detroit Free Press, for his series of photographs depicting student life at Southwestern High School in Detroit.

Letters, Drama and Music Awards

Fiction:
Breathing Lessons by Anne Tyler (Alfred A. Knopf)
Drama:
 The Heidi Chronicles by Wendy Wasserstein (Fireside Theatre)
History:
Battle Cry of Freedom: The Civil War Era by James M. McPherson (Oxford University Press)
History:
Parting the Waters: America in the King Years 1954-1963 by Taylor Branch (Simon & Schuster)
Biography or Autobiography:
Oscar Wilde by Richard Ellmann (Alfred A. Knopf)
Poetry:
New and Collected Poems by Richard Wilbur (Harcourt Brace Jovanovich)
General Non-fiction:
A Bright Shining Lie: John Paul Vann and America in Vietnam by Neil Sheehan (Random House)
Music:
Whispers Out of Time by Roger Reynolds (C. F. Peters) premiered on December 11, 1988, at Buckley Recital Hall, Amherst College, Massachusetts.

References

External links
 

Pulitzer Prizes by year
Pulitzer Prize
Pulitzer